= Path End Formation =

- Stratigraphic range: Neoproterozoic
- Type: Formation
- Unit of: Burin Group

Lithology
- Primary: Mafic volcanics

Location
- Region: Newfoundland
- Country: Canada
- Occurrence of the Path End Formation in southeastern Newfoundland

The Path End Formation is a formation cropping out in Newfoundland.
